The Constitution of Yugoslavia may refer to:

Chronology 
 Kingdom of Serbs, Croats and Slovenes
 1921 Vidovdan Constitution

 Kingdom of Yugoslavia (1929)
 1931 Yugoslav Constitution

 Federal People's Republic of Yugoslavia
 1946 Yugoslav Constitution
 1953 Yugoslav constitutional amendments

 Socialist Federal Republic of Yugoslavia
 1963 Yugoslav Constitution
 1974 Yugoslav Constitution

 Federal Republic of Yugoslavia
 1992 Yugoslav Constitution

See also
 Constitutional Charter of Serbia and Montenegro

Yugoslavia